The family Jubulaceae is a family of liverworts. The family name is derived from the genus Jubula.

Genera
According to GBIF;
 Amphijubula - 3 sp.
 Jubula  - 19 sp.
 Neohattoria  - 3 sp.
 Nipponolejeunea  - 3 sp.
 Salviatus 
 Schusterella - 6 sp.
 Steerea - 2 sp.

References

 
Liverwort families